Simi Selects India's Most Desirable  is a talk show aired on STAR World India, hosted by Indian film actress and TV host Simi Garewal. The show airs on STAR World on Sundays at 9pm. The premise of the show is a celebrity chat hosted by Simi Garewal. The interviews revolve around the romantic preferences of Indian celebrities from different fields, and include interviews with their parents. The show is filmed in front of a live studio audience and involves chat show as well as game elements such as dancing, singing, playing musical instruments, and baking. This show is based on idea to bring young single celebrities from India to come up and talk about their personal and professional life. The show's first celebrity was Ranbir Kapoor aired on 12 June 2011.

List of episodes

See also

References

Indian television talk shows